TheChâteau de Lormont, also known as the Château des Archevêques or the Château du Prince Noir, is a château in Lormont, Gironde, Nouvelle-Aquitaine, France.

Châteaux in Gironde
Monuments historiques of Gironde